Ole Evenrud (born November 17, 1962) is a Norwegian pop artist and teenpop producer. He had his big time in the 1980s under the name Ole i'dole. After the 1980s he has operated as a musical producer.

He was Head of A&R at Polygram Norway from 1993 until 1998, then became a full-time producer, while being the Head of Universal A&R until 2000. Since, Ole has had success with producing many teen-pop acts, such as A*Teens, Creamy and Little Trees.

In 2003 and 2005 he was a judge for the TV2-program Idol.

Discography

Albums
1980 - New Voice of Big Noise
1982 - Blond og billig
1985 - Popaganda
1986 - Idolator
1987 - This Ole Town
1989 - One Size Fits All
2005 - Høy og mørk
2006 - One Size Fits All (remastered) (includes bonus tracks)

Singles
1982 - Det vakke min skyld
1984 - Sayonara
1985 - Ayatollah
1986 - X-Ray Specs
1987 - This town ain't big enough for the both of us
1990 - I natt er verden vår

References
Ole Evenrud Biography, HitsVille Studio

External links
HitsVille Official Website - Ole Evenrud's Studio
Ole Evenrud Website - Only English in parts

1962 births
Living people
Norwegian musicians